Don Carlos Travis Jr. (1911-1996) was an American Associate professor of German studies at the University of Texas at Austin.

Government Service 
From 1942 to 1943 he was employed in the Office of Censorship in San Antonio.
From 1943 to 1945 he was employed in the Office of Censorship in Washington DC where he became Section Chief, Office of Director.
From 1945 to 1947 he was sent on the mission to Germany and Austria of the Library of Congress and became head of the mission.
Hans Beilhack visited the Munich Collection Point with Rehse, who complained about the loss of his life's work, his innocence, and the removal of the collection. Travis claimed the Library of Congress's right to confiscate Nazi Party material.
From 1947 to 1950 he was employed form the Office of Military Government, United States for Germany
From 1947-50 he was deployed at the Information Services Publications in Munich where he became Chief of Station.
From 1950 to 1952 he was deployed at the Information Services in Berlin, where he became Chief Information Officer.
From 1952 to 1954 he served the Rundfunk im amerikanischen Sektor and became Program director.
From 1954 to 1983 he taught at the University of Texas at Austin.
He specialized in eighteenth and nineteenth century German artistic and cultural history. 
He carried out research on the cultural and political background of the Nazi Party.
In 1983 he was retired.

Publications 
Editor, with introduction. A Hegel Symposium. Austin: U. of Texas, 1962; introduction, pp. 3–7
German Graphics of the Sixties: Catalogue of the Exhibition, February -March 1971, UT Art Museum (translated Introduction by Juliane Roh and compiled short biographies of the artists)
Reconciliation in the Work of Stefan Andres. Studies in Literature and Language, III, 2 (Summer 1961): 243-250
Texas Symposium: The German Language in America, Die Unterrichtspraxis  II,  104-112 Wilhelm Grose
In 1980 he edited: Stefan Andres: Ein Reader zu Person und Werk. Trier: Spee-Verlag, includes Die Rache der Schmetterlinge  pp. 144–159 (trans. by Frau Alma Zens from 1959 U. Wisconsin dissertation)

Translations
Karl Jaspers, Truth and Science, (Wahrheit und Wissenschaft) Graduate Journal, V, 1 (Spring 1962): 24-42
Rainer Maria Rilke, Buddhahood and Tod des Dichters, Modern European Poetry. New York:Bantam Books, 1966: 116 & 125
Günter Herburger, Where Ancestors Lived, Dimension II, 2 (1968): 226-245
Uwe Brandner, On the Eleventh Day: A Prose Song, Dimension II, 2 (1968): 324-333
Oskar Sandner, The Serpentine is Sensual, and other poems, Dimension 8 (1975):314-319
Oskar Sandner, Life is Hard in the Mountains Dimension 8 (1975): 320-327

Footnotes 

1911 births
1996 deaths
Germanists
People from Kenosha, Wisconsin
Mary D. Bradford High School alumni
American expatriates in Germany